Strode's Case 3 Howell's State Trials 294 is one of the earliest and most important English cases dealing with parliamentary privilege.

Facts 

Richard Strode was a Member of Parliament from Devon, England. In 1512, he introduced a bill to alleviate the harsh working conditions of tin miners on Dartmoor. However, the local stannary court had jurisdiction to enforce a law against the obstruction of tin mining and Strode was prosecuted and imprisoned before he could travel to Westminster to present his bill.

Strode's Act 

In response, Parliament passed Strode's Act, now named the Privilege of Parliament Act 1512 (4 Hen. 8 c. 8):

Constitutional implications 

In 1629, in the prosecution of Sir John Eliot (R v. Eliot, Hollis and Valentine), the court held that Strode's Act was a private act and applied to Strode only and not to other MPs. However, in 1667, both the Commons and the House of Lords carried resolutions declaring Strode's Act a general law:

This establishes the common law that privilege extends beyond mere protection against action for defamation or treason. The law was subsequently codified as Art. 9 of the Bill of Rights 1689.

References

Bibliography 
 Tanner, J.R. (1930) Tudor Constitutional Documents, AD1485-1603 
 Taswell-Langmead, T.P. (1997) English Constitutional History: From the Teutonic Conquest to the Present Time 

English case law
1512 in law
1512 in England
Tin mining
Legal immunity